The Liberation Tigers of Tamil Eelam (LTTE; , ; also known as the Tamil Tigers) was a Tamil militant organization that was based in northeastern Sri Lanka. The LTTE fought to create an independent Tamil state called Tamil Eelam in the north-east of the island, due to the continuous discrimination and violent persecution against Sri Lankan Tamils by the Sinhalese dominated Sri Lankan Government.

Violent persecution erupted in the form of the 1956 and 1958 anti-Tamil pogroms which were carried out by majority Sinhalese mobs often with state support following the passing of the 1956 Sinhala Only Act.

Founded in May 1976 by Velupillai Prabhakaran, the LTTE was involved in armed clashes against the Sri Lankan government and armed forces. Oppression against Sri Lankan Tamils continued by Sinhalese mobs, notably during the 1977 anti-Tamil pogrom and the 1981 burning of the Jaffna Public Library. Following the week-long July 1983 anti-Tamil pogrom carried out by Sinhalese mobs that came to be known as Black July, the LTTE's escalation of intermittent conflict into a full-scale nationalist insurgency began, which started the Sri Lankan Civil War. By this time, the LTTE was widely regarded as the most dominant Tamil militant group in Sri Lanka and among the most feared guerrilla forces in the world, while Prabhakaran's status as a freedom guerrilla fighter led to comparisons to revolutionary Che Guevara by global media, though Prabhakaran's actions were also widely viewed as terroristic.

Initially starting out as a guerrilla force, the LTTE increasingly came to resemble that of a conventional fighting force with a well-developed military wing that included a navy, an airborne unit, an intelligence wing, and a specialised suicide attack unit. The LTTE popularised and perfected the use of a suicide vest as a weapon, a tactic now used by many current militant organisations.

In particular, India's relationship with the LTTE was complex, as it went from initially supporting the organisation to engaging it in direct combat through the Indian Peace Keeping Force (IPKF), owing to changes in the former's foreign policy during the phase of the conflict. The LTTE gained global notoriety for using women and children in combat and carrying out a number of high-profile assassinations, including former Indian Prime Minister Rajiv Gandhi in 1991 and Sri Lankan President Ranasinghe Premadasa in 1993. Consequently, the LTTE has been designated as a terrorist organisation by 33 countries, including the European Union, Canada, the United States, and India.

Over the course of the conflict, the LTTE frequently exchanged control of territory in the north-east with the Sri Lankan military, with the two sides engaging in intense military confrontations. It was involved in four unsuccessful rounds of peace talks with the Sri Lankan government and at its peak in 2000, the LTTE was in control of 76% of the landmass in the Northern and Eastern provinces of Sri Lanka. Prabhakaran headed the organisation from its inception until his death in 2009. Between 1983 and 2009, at least 100,000 were killed in the civil war, of which many were Sri Lankan Tamils. 800,000 Sri Lankan Tamils also left Sri Lanka for various destinations, including Europe, North America, and Asia.

History

Background

Historical inter-ethnic imbalances between the Sinhalese and Tamil populations are alleged to have created the background of the LTTE. Post independent Sri Lankan governments attempted to reduce the increased presence of the Tamil minority in government jobs, which led to ethnic discrimination, seeded hatred and division policies including the "Sinhala Only Act" and gave rise to separatist ideologies among many Tamil leaders. By the 1970s, initial non-violent political struggle for an independent Tamil state was used as justification for a violent secessionist insurgency led by the LTTE.

In the early 1970s, United Front government of Sirimavo Bandaranaike introduced the policy of standardisation to curtail the number of Tamil students selected for certain faculties in the universities. In 1972, the government added a district quota as a parameter within each language. A student named Satiyaseelan formed Tamil Manavar Peravai (Tamil Students League) to counter this. This group comprised Tamil youth who advocated the rights of students to have fair enrolment. Inspired by the failed 1971 insurrection of Janatha Vimukthi Peramuna, it was the first Tamil insurgent group of its kind. It consisted of around 40 Tamil youth, including Ponnuthurai Sivakumaran (later, the leader of the Sivakumaran group), K. Pathmanaba (one of the founder members of EROS) and Velupillai Prabhakaran, an 18-year-old youth from single caste-oriented Valvettithurai (VVT).

In 1972, Prabhakaran teamed up with Chetti Thanabalasingam, Jaffna to form the Tamil New Tigers (TNT), with Thanabalasingham as its leader. After he was killed, Prabhakaran took over. At the same time, Nadarajah Thangathurai and Selvarajah Yogachandran (better known by his nom de guerre Kuttimani) were also involved in discussions about an insurgency. They would later (in 1979) create a separate organisation named Tamil Eelam Liberation Organisation (TELO) to campaign for the establishment of an independent Tamil Eelam. These groups, along with another prominent figure of the armed struggle, Ponnuthurai Sivakumaran, were involved in several hit-and-run operations against pro-government Tamil politicians, Sri Lanka Police and civil administration during the early 1970s. These attacks included throwing bombs at the residence and the car of SLFP Jaffna Mayor, Alfred Duraiyappah, placing a bomb at a carnival held in the stadium of Jaffna city (now "Duraiyappah stadium") and Neervely bank robbery. The 1974 Tamil conference incident during which intervention by Sri Lankan police resulted in 11 dead also sparked the anger of these militant groups. Both Sivakumaran and Prabhakaran attempted to assassinate Duraiyappah in revenge for the incident. Sivakumaran committed suicide on 5 June 1974, to evade capture by Police. On 27 July 1975, Prabhakaran assassinated Duraiyappah, who was branded as a "traitor" by TULF and the insurgents alike. Prabhakaran shot and killed the Mayor when he was visiting the Krishnan temple at Ponnalai.

Founding and rise to power

The LTTE was founded on 5 May 1976 as the successor to the Tamil New Tigers. Uma Maheswaran became its leader, and Prabhakaran its military commander. A five-member committee was also appointed. It has been stated that Prabhakaran sought to "refashion the old TNT/new LTTE into an elite, ruthlessly efficient, and highly professional fighting force", by the terrorism expert Rohan Gunaratna. Prabhakaran kept the numbers of the group small and maintained a high standard of training. The LTTE carried out low-key attacks against various government targets, including policemen and local politicians.

TULF support
Tamil United Liberation Front leader Appapillai Amirthalingam, who was in 1977 elected as the Opposition leader of Sri Lanka Parliament, clandestinely supported the LTTE. Amirthalingam believed that if he could exercise control over the Tamil insurgent groups, it would enhance his political position and pressure the government to agree to grant political autonomy to the Tamils. Thus, he provided letters of reference to the LTTE and to other Tamil insurgent groups to raise funds. Both Uma Maheswaran (a former surveyor) and Urmila Kandiah, the first female member of the LTTE, were prominent members of the TULF youth wing. Maheswaran was the secretary of TULF Tamil Youth Forum, Colombo branch. Amirthalingam introduced Prabhakaran to N. S. Krishnan, who later became the first international representative of LTTE. It was Krishnan who introduced Prabhakaran to Anton Balasingham, who later became the chief political strategist and chief negotiator of LTTE, which split for the first time in 1979. Uma Maheswaran was found to be having a love affair with Urmila Kandiah, which was against the code of conduct of LTTE. Prabhakaran expelled him and Maheswaran formed People's Liberation Organisation of Tamil Eelam (PLOTE) in 1980.

In 1980, Junius Richard Jayewardene's government agreed to devolve power by the means of District Development Councils upon the request of TULF. By this time, LTTE and other insurgent groups wanted a separate state. They had no faith in any sort of political solution. Thus the TULF and other Tamil political parties were steadily marginalized and insurgent groups emerged as the major force in the north. During this period of time, several other insurgent groups came into the arena, such as EROS (1975), TELO (1979), PLOTE (1980), EPRLF (1980) and TELA (1982). LTTE ordered civilians to boycott the local government elections of 1983 which TULF contested. Voter turnout became as low as 10%. Thereafter, Tamil political parties were largely unable to represent the Tamil people as insurgent groups took over their position.

Thirunelveli attack, 1983

The LTTE carried out its first major attack on 23 July 1983, when they ambushed Sri Lanka Army patrol Four Four Bravo at Thirunelveli, Jaffna. Thirteen Sri Lankan servicemen were killed in the attack, leading to the Black July pogrom where up to 3000 Tamil civilians were killed across the island.

Many consider Black July to be a planned rampage against the Tamil community of Sri Lanka, in which sections of the government were implicated.

Thousands of outraged Tamil youths joined Tamil militant groups to fight the Sri Lankan government, in what is considered a major catalyst to the insurgency in Sri Lanka.

Indian support
In reaction to various geo-political (see Indian intervention in the Sri Lankan Civil War) and economic factors, from August 1983 to May 1987, India, through its intelligence agency Research and Analysis Wing (RAW), provided arms, training and monetary support to six Sri Lankan Tamil insurgent groups including the LTTE. During that period, 32 camps were set up in India to train these 495 LTTE insurgents, including 90 women who were trained in 10 batches. The first batch of Tigers were trained in Establishment 22 based in Chakrata, Uttarakhand. The second batch, including LTTE intelligence chief Pottu Amman, trained in Himachal Pradesh. Prabakaran visited the first and the second batch of Tamil Tigers to see them training. Eight other batches of LTTE were trained in Tamil Nadu. Thenmozhi Rajaratnam alias Dhanu, who carried out the assassination of Rajiv Gandhi and Sivarasan—the key conspirator were among the militants trained by RAW, in Nainital, India.

In April 1984, the LTTE formally joined a common militant front, the Eelam National Liberation Front (ENLF), a union between LTTE, the Tamil Eelam Liberation Organisation (TELO), the Eelam Revolutionary Organisation of Students (EROS), the People's Liberation Organisation of Tamil Eelam (PLOTE) and the Eelam People's Revolutionary Liberation Front (EPRLF).

Clashes with other insurgent groups
TELO usually held the Indian view of problems and pushed for India's view during peace talks with Sri Lanka and other groups. LTTE denounced the TELO view and claimed that India was only acting on its own interest. As a result, the LTTE broke from the ENLF in 1986. Soon fighting broke out between the TELO and the LTTE and clashes occurred over the next few months. As a result, almost the entire TELO leadership and at least 400 TELO militants were killed by the LTTE. The LTTE attacked training camps of the EPRLF a few months later, forcing it to withdraw from the Jaffna peninsula. Notices were issued to the effect that all remaining Tamil insurgents join the LTTE in Jaffna and in Madras, where the Tamil groups were headquartered. With the major groups including the TELO and EPRLF eliminated, the remaining 20 or so Tamil insurgent groups were then absorbed into the LTTE, making Jaffna an LTTE-dominated city.

Another practice that increased support by Tamil people was LTTE's members taking an oath of loyalty which stated LTTE's goal of establishing a state for the Sri Lankan Tamils. In 1987 LTTE established the Black Tigers, a unit responsible for conducting suicide attacks against political, economic, and military targets, and launched its first suicide attack against a Sri Lankan Army camp, killing 40 soldiers. LTTE members were prohibited from smoking cigarettes and consuming alcohol in any form. LTTE members were required to avoid their family members and avoid communication with them. Initially, LTTE members were prohibited from having love affairs or sexual relationships as it could deter their prime motive, but this policy changed after Prabhakaran married Mathivathani Erambu in October 1984.

IPKF period

In July 1987, faced with growing anger among its own Tamils and a flood of refugees, India intervened directly in the conflict for the first time by initially airdropping food parcels into Jaffna. After negotiations, India and Sri Lanka entered into the Indo-Sri Lanka Accord. Though the conflict was between the Tamil and Sinhalese people, India and Sri Lanka signed the peace accord instead of India influencing both parties to sign a peace accord among themselves. The peace accord assigned a certain degree of regional autonomy in the Tamil areas, with Eelam People's Revolutionary Liberation Front (EPRLF) controlling the regional council and called for the Tamil militant groups to surrender. India was to send a peacekeeping force, named the Indian Peace Keeping Force (IPKF), part of the Indian Army, to Sri Lanka to enforce the disarmament and to watch over the regional council.

War against IPKF
Although the Tamil militant organizations did not have a role in the Indo-Lanka agreement, most groups, including EPRLF, TELO, EROS, and PLOTE, accepted it. LTTE rejected the accord because they opposed EPRLF's Varadaraja Perumal as the chief ministerial candidate for the merged North Eastern Province. The LTTE named three alternate candidates for the position, which India rejected. The LTTE subsequently refused to hand over their weapons to the IPKF. After three months of tensions, LTTE declared war on IPKF on 7 October 1987.

Thus LTTE engaged in military conflict with the Indian Army, and launched its first attack on an Indian army rations truck on 8 October, killing five Indian para-commandos who were on board by strapping burning tires around their necks. The government of India stated that the IPKF should disarm the LTTE by force. The Indian Army launched assaults on the LTTE, including a month-long campaign, Operation Pawan to win control of the Jaffna Peninsula. The ruthlessness of this campaign, and the Indian army's subsequent anti-LTTE operations, which included civilian massacres and rapes made it extremely unpopular among many Tamils in Sri Lanka.

Premadasa government support
The Indian intervention was also unpopular among the Sinhalese majority. Prime Minister Ranasinghe Premadasa pledged to withdraw IPKF as soon as he is elected president during his presidential election campaign in 1988. After being elected, in April 1989, he started negotiations with LTTE. President Premadasa ordered the Sri Lanka Army to clandestinely hand over arms consignments to the LTTE to fight the IPKF and its proxy, the Tamil National Army (TNA). These consignments included RPGs, mortars, self-loading rifles, Type 81 assault rifle, T56 automatic rifles, pistols, hand grenades, ammunition, and communications sets. Moreover, millions of dollars were also passed on to the LTTE.

After IPKF
The last members of the IPKF, which was estimated to have had a strength of well over 100,000 at its peak, left the country in March 1990 upon the request of President Premadasa. Unstable peace initially held between the government and the LTTE, and peace talks progressed towards providing devolution for Tamils in the north and east of the country. A ceasefire held between LTTE and the government from June 1989 to June 1990, but broke down as LTTE massacred 600 police officers in the Eastern Province.

Fighting continued throughout the 1990s, and was marked by two key assassinations carried out by the LTTE: those of former Indian Prime Minister Rajiv Gandhi in 1991, and Sri Lankan President Ranasinghe Premadasa in 1993, using suicide bombers on both occasions. The fighting briefly halted in 1994 following the election of Chandrika Kumaratunga as President of Sri Lanka and the onset of peace talks, but fighting resumed after LTTE sank two Sri Lanka Navy Fast Attack Craft in April 1995. In a series of military operations that followed, the Sri Lanka Armed Forces recaptured the Jaffna Peninsula. Further offensives followed over the next three years, and the military captured large areas in the north of the country from the LTTE, including areas in the Vanni region, the town of Kilinochchi, and many smaller towns. From 1998 onward, the LTTE regained control of these areas, which culminated in the capture in April 2000 of the strategically important Elephant Pass base complex, located at the entrance of the Jaffna Peninsula, after prolonged fighting against the Sri Lanka Army.

Mahattaya, a one-time deputy leader of LTTE, was accused of treason by the LTTE and killed in 1994. He is said to have collaborated with the Indian Research and Analysis Wing to remove Prabhakaran from the LTTE leadership.

2002 ceasefire

In 2002, the LTTE dropped its demand for a separate state, instead demanding a form of regional autonomy. Following the landslide election defeat of Kumaratunga and Ranil Wickramasinghe coming to power in December 2001, the LTTE declared a unilateral ceasefire. The Sri Lankan Government agreed to the ceasefire, and in March 2002 the Ceasefire Agreement (CFA) was signed. As part of the agreement, Norway and other Nordic countries agreed to jointly monitor the ceasefire through the Sri Lanka Monitoring Mission.

Six rounds of peace talks between the Government of Sri Lanka and LTTE were held, but they were temporarily suspended after the LTTE pulled out of the talks in 2003 claiming "certain critical issues relating to the ongoing peace process". In 2003 the LTTE proposed an Interim Self Governing Authority (ISGA). This move was approved of by the international community but rejected by the Sri Lankan President. The LTTE boycotted the presidential election in December 2005. While LTTE claimed that the people under its control were free to vote, it is alleged that they used threats to prevent the population from voting. The United States condemned this.

The new government of Sri Lanka came into power in 2006 and demanded to abrogate the ceasefire agreement, stating that the ethnic conflict could only have a military solution, and that the only way to achieve this was by eliminating the LTTE. Further peace talks were scheduled in Oslo, Norway, on 8 and 9 June 2006, but cancelled when the LTTE refused to meet directly with the government delegation, stating its fighters were not being allowed safe passage to travel to the talks. Norwegian mediator Erik Solheim told journalists that the LTTE should take direct responsibility for the collapse of the talks. Rifts grew between the government and LTTE, and resulted in a number of ceasefire agreement violations by both sides during 2006. Suicide attacks, military skirmishes, and air raids took place during the latter part of 2006. Between February 2002 to May 2007, the Sri Lanka Monitoring Mission documented 3,830 ceasefire violations by the LTTE, with respect to 351 by the security forces. Military confrontation continued into 2007 and 2008. In January 2008 the government officially pulled out of the Cease Fire Agreement.

Dissension

In the most significant show of dissent from within the organisation, a senior LTTE commander named Colonel Karuna (nom de guerre of Vinayagamoorthi Muralitharan) broke away from the LTTE in March 2004 and formed the TamilEela Makkal Viduthalai Pulikal (later Tamil Makkal Viduthalai Pulikal), amid allegations that the northern commanders were overlooking the needs of the eastern Tamils. The LTTE leadership accused him of mishandling funds and questioned him about his recent personal behaviour. He tried to take control of the eastern province from the LTTE, which caused clashes between the LTTE and TMVP. The LTTE has suggested that TMVP was backed by the government, and the Nordic SLMM monitors corroborated this. It was later revealed that UNP Member of Parliament Seyed Ali Zahir Moulana had played an important role in the defection of Colonel Karuna from the LTTE to the Government.

Military defeat

Mahinda Rajapaksa was elected as the president of Sri Lanka in 2005. After a brief period of negotiations, LTTE pulled out of peace talks indefinitely. Sporadic violence had continued and on 25 April 2006, LTTE tried to assassinate Sri Lankan Army Commander Lieutenant General Sarath Fonseka. Following the attack, the European Union proscribed the LTTE as a terrorist organisation. A new crisis leading to the first large-scale fighting since signing of the ceasefire occurred when the LTTE closed the sluice gates of the Mavil Oya (Mavil Aru) reservoir on 21 July 2006, and cut the water supply to 15,000 villages in government controlled areas. This dispute developed into a full-scale war by August 2006.

After the breakdown of the peace process in 2006, the Sri Lankan military launched a major offensive against the Tigers, defeating the LTTE militarily and bringing the entire country under its control. Human rights groups criticised the nature of the victory which included the internment of Tamil civilians in concentration camps with little or no access to outside agencies. Victory over the Tigers was declared by Sri Lankan President Mahinda Rajapaksa on 16 May 2009, and the LTTE admitted defeat on 17 May 2009. Prabhakaran was killed by government forces on 19 May 2009. Selvarasa Pathmanathan succeeded Prabhakaran as leader of the LTTE, but he was later arrested in Malaysia and handed over to the Sri Lankan government in August 2009.

Defeat in the East

Eelam War IV had commenced in the East. Mavil Aru came under the control of the Sri Lanka Army by 15 August 2006. Systematically, Sampoor, Vakarai, Kanjikudichchi Aru and Batticaloa also came under military control. The military then captured Thoppigala, the Tiger stronghold in Eastern Province on 11 July 2007. IPKF had failed to capture it from LTTE during its offensive in 1988.

Defeat in the North

Sporadic fighting had been happening in the North for months, but the intensity of the clashes increased after September 2007. Gradually, the defence lines of the LTTE began to fall. The advancing military confined the LTTE into rapidly diminishing areas in the North. Prabhakaran was seriously injured during air strikes carried out by the Sri Lanka Air Force on a bunker complex in Jayanthinagar on 26 November 2007. Earlier, on 2 November 2007, S. P. Thamilselvan, who was the head of the rebels' political wing, was killed during another government air raid. On 2 January 2008, the Sri Lankan government officially abandoned the ceasefire agreement. By 2 August 2008, LTTE lost the Mannar District following the fall of Vellankulam town. Troops captured Pooneryn and Mankulam during the final months of 2008.

On 2 January 2009, the President of Sri Lanka, Mahinda Rajapaksa, announced that the Sri Lankan troops had captured Kilinochchi, the city which the LTTE had used for over a decade as its de facto administrative capital. On the same day, President Rajapaksa called upon LTTE to surrender. It was stated that the loss of Kilinochchi had caused substantial damage to the LTTE's public image, and that the LTTE was likely to collapse under military pressure on multiple fronts. As of 8 January 2009, the LTTE abandoned its positions on the Jaffna peninsula to make a last stand in the jungles of Mullaitivu, their last main base. The Jaffna Peninsula was captured by the Sri Lankan Army by 14 January. On 25 January 2009, SLA troops "completely captured" Mullaitivu town, the last major LTTE stronghold.

President Mahinda Rajapaksa declared military victory over the Tamil Tigers on 16 May 2009, after 26 years of conflict. The rebels offered to lay down their weapons in return for a guarantee of safety. On 17 May 2009, LTTE's head of the Department of International Relations, Selvarasa Pathmanathan conceded defeat, saying in an email statement, "this battle has reached its bitter end".

Aftermath
With the end of the hostilities, 11,664 LTTE members, including 595 child soldiers surrendered to the Sri Lankan military. Approximately 150 hardcore LTTE cadres and 1,000 mid-level cadres escaped to India. The government took action to rehabilitate the surrendered cadres under a National Action Plan for the Re-integration of Ex-combatants while allegations of torture, rape, and murder were reported by international human rights bodies. They were divided into three categories; hardcore, non-combatants, and those who were forcibly recruited (including child soldiers). Twenty-four rehabilitation centres were set up in Jaffna, Batticaloa, and Vavuniya. Among the apprehended cadres, there had been about 700 hardcore members. Some of these cadres were integrated into the State Intelligence Service to tackle the internal and external networks of LTTE. By August 2011, government had released more than 8,000 cadres, and 2,879 remained.

Continued operations
After the death of LTTE leader Prabhakaran and the most powerful members of the organisation, Selvarasa Pathmanathan (alias KP) was its sole first generation leader left alive. He assumed duty as the new leader of LTTE on 21 July 2009. A statement was issued, allegedly from the executive committee of the LTTE, stating that Pathmanathan had been appointed leader of the LTTE. 15 days after the announcement, on 5 August 2009, a Sri Lankan military intelligence unit, with the collaboration of local authorities, captured Pathmanathan in the Tune Hotel, in downtown Kuala Lumpur, Malaysia. Sri Lanka Ministry of Defence alleges that Perinpanayagam Sivaparan alias Nediyavan of the Tamil Eelam People's Alliance (TEPA) in Norway, Suren Surendiran of British Tamils Forum (BTF), Father S. J. Emmanuel of Global Tamil Forum (GTF), Visvanathan Rudrakumaran of Transnational Government of Tamil Eelam (TGTE) and Sekarapillai Vinayagamoorthy alias Kathirgamathamby Arivazhagan alias Vinayagam, a former senior intelligence leader are trying to revive the organisation among the Tamil diaspora. Subsequently, in May 2011, Nediyavan, who advocates an armed struggle against the Sri Lankan state, was arrested and released on bail in Norway, pending further investigation.

Divisions

The LTTE was viewed as a disciplined and militarised group with a leader of a significant military and organisational skills. Three major divisions of the LTTE were the military, intelligence, and political wings.

The military wing consisted of at least 11 separate divisions including the conventional fighting forces, Charles Anthony Brigade and Jeyanthan Brigade; the suicide wing called the Black Tigers; naval wing Sea Tigers, air-wing Air Tigers, LTTE leader Prabhakaran's personal security divisions, Imran Pandian regiment and Ratha regiment; auxiliary military units such as Kittu artillery brigade, Kutti Sri mortar brigade, Ponnamman mining unit and hit-and-run squads like Pistol gang. Charles Anthony brigade was the first conventional fighting formation created by LTTE. Sea Tiger division was founded in 1984, under the leadership of Thillaiyampalam Sivanesan alias Soosai. LTTE acquired its first light aircraft in the late 1990s. Vaithilingam Sornalingam alias Shankar was instrumental in creating the Air Tigers. It carried out nine air attacks since 2007, including a suicide air raid targeting Sri Lanka Air Force headquarters, Colombo in February 2009. LTTE is the only terrorist-proscribed organisation to acquire aircraft. LTTE intelligence wing consisted of Tiger Organisation Security Intelligence Service aka TOSIS, run by Pottu Amman, and a separate military intelligence division. It was forbidden for the LTTE members to consume tobacco and alcohol. Illicit sex was also prohibited. Each member carried a cyanide capsule with orders to use it if captured.

The LTTE operated a systematic and powerful political wing, which functioned like a separate state in the LTTE controlled area. In 1989, it established a political party named People's Front of Liberation Tigers, under Gopalaswamy Mahendraraja alias Mahattaya. It was abandoned soon after. Later, S. P. Thamilselvan was appointed the head of the political wing. He was also a member of the LTTE delegation for Norwegian brokered peace talks. After the death of Thamilselvan in November 2007, Balasingham Nadesan was appointed as its leader. Major sections within the political wing include International peace secretariat, led by Pulidevan, LTTE Police, LTTE court, Bank of Tamil Eelam, Sports division and the "Voice of Tigers" radio broadcasting station of LTTE.

LTTE used female cadres for military engagements. Its women's wing consisted of Malathi and Sothiya Brigades.

The LTTE also controlled a powerful international wing called the "KP branch", controlled by Selvarasa Pathmanathan, "Castro branch", controlled by Veerakathy Manivannam alias Castro, and "Aiyannah group" led by Ponniah Anandaraja alias Aiyannah.

Governance

During its active years, the LTTE had established and administered a de facto state under its control, named Tamil Eelam with Kilinochchi as its administrative capital, and had managed a government in its territory, providing state functions such as courts, a police force, a human rights organisation, and a humanitarian assistance board, a health board, and an education board. However, the court system, composed of young judges with little or no legal training had operated without codified or defined legal authority, and essentially operated as agents of the LTTE rather than as an independent judiciary. It ran a bank (Bank of Tamil Eelam), a radio station (Voice of Tigers) and a television station (National Television of Tamil Eelam). In the LTTE-controlled areas, women reported lower levels of domestic violence because "the Tigers had a de facto justice system to deal with domestic violence." The United States Department of State Human Rights Reports have described LTTE's governance as an authoritarian military rule, denying the people under its authority the right to change their government, infringing on their privacy rights, routinely violating their civil liberties, operating an unfair court system, restricting freedom of movement and severely discriminating against ethnic and religious minorities.

In 2003, the LTTE issued a proposal to establish an Interim Self Governing Authority in the 8 districts of the North and East which it controlled. The ISGA was to be entrusted with powers such as the right to impose law, collect taxes and oversee the rehabilitation process until a favourable solution was reached after which elections would be held. The ISGA would consist of members representing the LTTE, GoSL and the Muslim community. According to the proposal, this LTTE administration intended to be a secular one with principal emphasis on prohibition of discrimination and protection of all communities.

Local perception and support

Due to its military victories, policies, call for national self-determination and constructive Tamil nationalist platform, the LTTE was supported by major sections of the Tamil community. A survey carried out in 2002 from a sample of 89 Sri Lankan Tamils found that 89% regarded the LTTE as their sole representatives. However, University Teachers for Human Rights (Jaffna) claimed that "by combination of internal terror and narrow nationalist ideology the LTTE succeeded in atomising the community. It took away not only the right to oppose but even the right to evaluate, as a community, the course they were taking. This gives a semblance of illusion that the whole society is behind the LTTE." The UTHR (J) has been described by Prof. Peter Schalk, an affiliate of the Transnational government of Tamil Eelam as having a 'solid reputation of being anti-LTTE'.

Ideology
The LTTE was a self-styled national liberation organisation with the primary goal of establishing an independent Tamil state. Tamil nationalism was the primary basis of its ideology. The LTTE was influenced by Indian freedom fighters such as Subhas Chandra Bose. The organisation denied being a separatist movement and saw itself as fighting for self-determination and restoration of sovereignty in what it recognised as its homeland. Although most Tigers were Hindus, the LTTE was an avowedly secular organisation; religion did not play any significant part in its ideology. Leader Velupillai Prabhakaran criticised what he saw as the oppressive features of traditional Hindu Tamil society, such as the caste system and gender inequality. The LTTE presented itself as a revolutionary movement seeking widespread change within Tamil society, not just independence from the Sri Lankan state. Therefore, its ideology called for the removal of caste discrimination and support for women's liberation. Prabhakaran described his political philosophy as "revolutionary socialism", with the goal of creating an "egalitarian society". When asked about the LTTE's economic policy, Velupillai Pirabaharan said an "open market economy." But he pointed out that: "We can only think about a proper economic structure when the ethnic problem is resolved. ... What form and what structure this economic system is to be instituted in can only be worked when we have a permanent settlement or independent state."

LTTE claims to strive for a democratic, secular state that is based on socialism.

Global network

LTTE had developed a large international network since the days of N. S. Krishnan, who served as its first international representative. In the late 1970s, TULF parliamentarian and opposition leader A. Amirthalingam provided letters of reference for fundraising, and V. N. Navaratnam, who was an executive committee member of the Inter-Parliamentary Union (IPU), introduced many influential and wealthy Tamils living overseas to Tamil insurgent leaders. Navaratnam also introduced LTTE members to the members of Polisario Front, a national liberation movement in Morocco, at a meeting held in Oslo, Norway. In 1978, during the world tour of Amirthalingam (with London-based Eelam activist S. K. Vaikundavasan), he formed the World Tamil Coordinating Committee (WTCC), which was later found to be an LTTE front organisation. The global contacts of LTTE grew steadily since then. At the height of its power, LTTE had 42 offices worldwide. The international network of LTTE engages in propaganda, fundraising, arms procurement, and shipping.

There were three types of organisations that engage in propaganda and fund raising—Front, Cover, and Sympathetic. Prior to the ethnic riots of 1983, attempts to raise funds for a sustaining military campaign were not realised. It was the mass exodus of Tamil civilians to India and western countries following the Black July ethnic riots, which made this possible. As the armed conflict evolved and voluntary donations lessened, LTTE used force and threats to collect money. LTTE was worth US$200–300 million at its peak. The group's global network owned numerous business ventures in various countries. These include investment in real estate, shipping, grocery stores, gold and jewellery stores, gas stations, restaurants, production of films, mass media organisations (TV, radio, print), and industries. It was also in control of numerous charitable organisations including Tamils Rehabilitation Organisation, which was banned and had its funds frozen by the United States Treasury in 2007 for covertly financing terrorism.

Arms Procurement and shipping activities of LTTE were largely clandestine. Prior to 1983, it procured weapons mainly from Afghanistan via the Indo-Pakistani border. Explosives were purchased from commercial markets in India. From 1983 to 1987, LTTE acquired a substantial amount of weapons from RAW and from Lebanon, Cyprus, Singapore, and Malaysia-based arms dealers. LTTE received its first consignment of arms from Singapore in 1984 on board the MV Cholan, the first ship owned by the organisation. Funds were received and cargo cleared at Chennai Port with the assistance of M. G. Ramachandran, the Chief Minister of Tamil Nadu. In November 1994, the LTTE was able to purchase 60 tonnes of explosives (50 tonnes of TNT and 10 tonnes of RDX) from Rubezone Chemical plant in Ukraine, providing a forged Bangladeshi Ministry of Defense end-user certificate. Payments for the explosives were made from a Citibank account in Singapore held by Selvarasa Pathmanathan. Consignment was transported on board MV Sewne. The same explosives were used for the Central Bank bombing in 1996. Myanmar, Thailand, Malaysia, Cambodia and Indonesia remained the most trusted outposts of LTTE, after India alienated it after the assassination of Rajiv Gandhi.

Since late 1997, North Korea became the principal country to provide arms, ammunition, and explosives to the LTTE. The deal with North Korean government was carried out by Ponniah Anandaraja alias Aiyannah, a member of World Tamil Coordinating Committee of the United States and later, the accountant of LTTE. He worked at the North Korean embassy in Bangkok since late 1997. LTTE had nearly 20-second-hand ships, which were purchased in Japan, and registered in Panama and other Latin American countries. These ships mostly transported general cargo, including paddy, sugar, timber, glass, and fertilizer. But when an arms deal was finalized, they travelled to North Korea, loaded the cargo and brought it to the equator, where the ships were based. Then on board merchant tankers, weapons were transferred to the sea of Alampil, just outside the territorial waters in Sri Lanka's exclusive economic zone. After that, small teams of Sea Tigers brought the cargo ashore. The Sri Lanka Navy, during 2005–08 destroyed at least 11 of these cargo ships belonged to LTTE in the international waters.

LTTE's last shipment of weapons was in March 2009, towards the end of the war. The merchant vessel Princess Iswari went from Indonesia to North Korea under captain Kamalraj Kandasamy alias Vinod, loaded the weapons and came back to international waters beyond Sri Lanka. But due to the heavy naval blockades set up by the Sri Lankan Navy, it could not deliver the arms consignment. Thus it dumped the weapons in the sea. The same ship, after changing its name to MV Ocean Lady, arrived in Vancouver with 76 migrants, in October 2009. In December 2009, The Sri Lankan Navy apprehended a merchant vessel belonging to LTTE, Princess Chrisanta in Indonesia and brought it back to Sri Lanka.

The United States Senate Committee on Foreign Relations (USSFRC) and Ethiopian based Jimma Times claimed that the Eritrean government had provided direct military assistance, including light aircraft to LTTE, during the 2002–03 period when the LTTE was negotiating with the Sri Lankan government via the Norwegian mediators. It was also alleged that Erik Solheim, the chief Norwegian facilitator, helped LTTE to establish this relationship. These allegations and a suspicion from within the Sri Lankan armed forces, that LTTE had considerable connections and assets in Eritrea and that its leader Prabhakaran might try to flee to Eritrea in the final stages of war, prompted the Sri Lankan government to establish diplomatic relations with Eritrea in 2009.

Proscription as a terrorist group

33 countries currently list the LTTE as a terrorist organization. As of October 2019, these include:
 India (since 1992)
 United States (designated as Foreign Terrorist Organizations by the Department of State since 8 October 1997. Named as a Specially Designated Global Terrorist (SDGT) since 2 November 2001)
 United Kingdom (designated a Proscribed Terrorist Group under the Terrorism Act 2000 since 29 March 2001)
 European Union (since 2006; 27 countries)
 Canada (since 2006) Canada does not grant residency to LTTE members on the grounds that they have participated in crimes against humanity.
 Sri Lanka (from January 1998 to 4 September 2002, and again from 7 January 2009)
Malaysia (since 2014)

The first country to ban the LTTE was its brief one-time ally, India. The Indian change of policy came gradually, starting with the IPKF-LTTE conflict, and culminating with the assassination of Rajiv Gandhi. India opposes the new state Tamil Eelam that LTTE wants to establish, saying that it would lead to Tamil Nadu's separation from India, despite the leaders and common populace of Tamil Nadu considering themselves Indian. Sri Lanka itself lifted the ban on the LTTE before signing the ceasefire agreement in 2002. This was a prerequisite set by the LTTE for the signing of the agreement. The Indian Government extended the ban on LTTE considering their strong anti-India posture and threat to the security of Indian nationals.

The European Union banned LTTE as a terrorist organization on 17 May 2006. In a statement, the European Parliament said that the LTTE did not represent all Tamils and called on it to "allow for political pluralism and alternate democratic voices in the northern and eastern parts of Sri Lanka".

In October 2014, the European Court of Justice annulled the anti-terrorism sanctions and several other restrictions placed on the LTTE in 2006. The court noted that the basis of proscribing the LTTE had been based on "imputations derived from the press and the Internet" rather than on direct investigation of the group's actions, as required by law. Later, in March 2015, the EU reimposed the sanctions and restrictions.

In July 2017, the LTTE was removed from the terrorism blacklist of European Union's top court, stating that there was no evidence to show of LTTE carrying out attacks after its military defeat in 2009. However, despite the European Court of Justice (ECJ) ruling, the European Union stated the LTTE organization remains listed as a terrorist organization by the EU.

The LTTE leader Prabhakaran contested the terrorist designation of his organization, asserting that the international community had been influenced by the "false propaganda" of the Sri Lankan state and said that there was no coherent definition of the concept of terrorism. He also maintained that the LTTE was a national liberation organization fighting against "state terrorism" and "racist oppression". Following 9/11, in an effort to distance his organization from the "real terrorists", the LTTE leader expressed sympathy to the Western powers engaged in a war against international terrorism and urged them to provide "a clear and comprehensive definition of the concept of terrorism that would distinguish between freedom struggles based on the right to self-determination and blind terrorist acts based on fanaticism." He also expressed concern over states with human rights abuses like Sri Lanka joining the alliance in the war against terrorism as "posing a threat to the legitimate political struggles of the oppressed humanity subjected to state terror."

Karen Parker, an attorney specializing in human rights and humanitarian law, argued that the LTTE was not a terrorist organization but "an armed force in a war against the government of Sri Lanka." She characterized the war waged by the LTTE as "a war of national liberation in the exercise of the right of self-determination."

Suicide attacks

One of the main divisions of LTTE included the Black Tigers, an elite fighting wing of the movement, whose mission included carrying out suicide attacks against enemy targets. From ancient times, the Tamil civilization saw war as an honorable sacrifice, and fallen heroes were revered and worshiped in the form of a hero stone. Heroic martyrdom was glorified in ancient Tamil literature. The Tamil kings and warriors followed an honor code similar to that of the Japanese Samurai and committed suicide to preserve their honor. The Black Tigers wing of the LTTE is said to reflect some of elements of Tamil martial traditions including the practice of the worship of fallen heroes (Maaveerar Naal) and martial martyrdom. All soldiers of LTTE carried a suicide pill (Cyanide Kuppi) around their necks to escape captivity and torture by enemy forces.

According to the International Institute for Strategic Studies, LTTE was the first insurgent organization to use concealed explosive belts and vests. According to the information published by the LTTE, the Black Tigers carried out 378 suicide attacks between 5 July 1987 and 20 November 2008. Out of the deceased, 274 were male and 104 were female. Experts estimated that the Black Tigers had carried out most of the suicide attacks recorded around the world by the time the Sri Lankan civil war ended in 2009. Riaz Hassan, an expert on suicide missions, states the following:

Most of these attacks targeted military objectives in the north and east of the country, although civilians were killed on many occasions. The LTTE was responsible for a 1998 attack on the Buddhist shrine and UNESCO World Heritage Site Sri Dalada Maligawa in Kandy that killed eight worshippers. The attack was symbolic in that the shrine, which houses a tooth of the Buddha, is the holiest Buddhist shrine in Sri Lanka. Other Buddhist shrines have been attacked, notably the Sambuddhaloka Temple in Colombo, in which nine worshippers were killed.

The Black Tiger wing carried out attacks on various high-profile leaders both inside and outside Sri Lanka. It successfully targeted three world leaders, the only insurgent group to do so. That includes the assassination of Rajiv Gandhi, the former Prime Minister of India on 21 May 1991, the assassination of Ranasinghe Premadasa, the President of Sri Lanka on 1 May 1993, and the failed assassination attempt of Chandrika Kumaratunga, the Sri Lankan President on 18 December 1999, which resulted in the loss of her right eye.

Black Tiger cadres killed in action were highly glorified and their families were given the "Maaveerar family" status, just like normal LTTE cadres. Also, these families were honored with the "Thamizheezha Maravar pathakkam" (Warrior medal of Tamil Eelam), one of the higher honors of Tamil Eelam. Black Tiger members were given a chance to have his/her last supper with the LTTE leader Prabhakaran, which was a rare honor, motivating LTTE cadres to join the Black Tiger wing.

On 28 November 2007, an LTTE suicide bomber named Sujatha Vagawanam detonated a bomb hidden inside her bra in an attempt to kill Sri Lankan minister Douglas Devananda. This was recorded in the security cameras inside Devananda's office. It is one of the few detonations of an explosive by a suicide bomber recorded on camera.

Assassinations

The LTTE has been condemned by various groups for assassinating political and military opponents. The victims include Tamil moderates who coordinated with the Sri Lanka Government and Tamil paramilitary groups assisting the Sri Lankan Army. The assassination of the Sri Lankan president Ranasinghe Premadasa is attributed to LTTE. The seventh Prime Minister of the Republic of India, Rajiv Gandhi, was assassinated by an LTTE suicide bomber Thenmozhi Rajaratnam on 21 May 1991. On 24 October 1994, LTTE detonated a bomb during a political rally in Thotalanga-Grandpass, which killed most of the prominent politicians of the United National Party, including presidential candidate Gamini Dissanayake MP, Cabinet ministers Weerasinghe Mallimarachchi and G. M. Premachandra, Ossie Abeygunasekara MP and Gamini Wijesekara MP.

LTTE sympathisers justify some of the assassinations by arguing that the people attacked were combatants or persons closely associated with Sri Lankan military intelligence. Specifically in relation to the TELO, the LTTE has said that it had to perform preemptive self-defence because the TELO was in effect functioning as a proxy for India.

Human rights violations
The United States Department of State states that its reason for banning LTTE as a proscribed terrorist group is based on allegations that LTTE does not respect human rights and that it does not adhere to the standards of conduct expected of a resistance movement or what might be called "freedom fighters". The FBI has described the LTTE as "amongst the most dangerous and deadly extremist outfits in the world". The FBI further states that "LTTE's ruthless tactics have inspired terrorist networks worldwide, including Al-Qaeda in Iraq". Other countries have also proscribed LTTE under the same rationale. Numerous countries and international organizations have accused the LTTE of attacking civilians and recruiting children. Despite the allegations of human rights abuses, the LTTE has been noted for its general lack of use of sexual violence or rape as a tactic, though there have been allegations of rape made against LTTE members. The LTTE raped Sinhalese women during a massacre of Sinhalese in October 1995. Some LTTE members accused of rape faced execution from the leadership.

Attacks on civilians

The LTTE has launched attacks on civilian targets several times. Attacks were often alleged to be carried out in revenge for attacks committed by the Sri Lankan Army, such as the Anuradhapura massacre which immediately followed the Valvettithurai massacre. Notable attacks include the Aranthalawa massacre, Anuradhapura massacre, Kattankudy mosque massacre, the Kebithigollewa massacre, and the Dehiwala train bombing. Civilians have also been killed in attacks on economic targets, such as the Central Bank bombing. Around 3,700 to 4,100 civilians were killed in LTTE attacks. The LTTE leader Prabhakaran denied allegations of killing innocent Sinhalese civilians, claiming to condemn such acts of violence; and claimed that LTTE had instead attacked armed Home Guards who were "death-squads let loose on Tamil civilians" and Sinhalese settlers who were "brought to the Tamil areas to forcibly occupy the land." The state-sponsored settlements of Sinhalese in the northern and eastern parts of the island which the LTTE considered to be the traditional homeland of Tamils became "the sites of some of the worst violence." Similarly, the LTTE denied massacring Muslims, stating that they were allies against the Sinhalese state.

According to the International Crisis Group, the Sri Lankan government implemented the military-led settlements of Sinhalese community in Tamil areas in order to create "a buffer to the expansion of LTTE control" and to "undermine Tamil nationalist claims on a contiguous north-eastern Tamil homeland." The continuous inflow of Sinhalese settlers in Tamil areas since the 1950s had become a source of inter-ethnic violence and had been one of the major grievances expressed by the LTTE. During the beginning of the war, Sinhalese settlements, some armed, were created in Weli Oya, displacing many Tamil families living in the area. As such, Weli Oya saw numerous retaliatory attacks on Sinhalese settlers by the LTTE. At the same time, the LTTE has attacked long-existing Sinhalese residents within their claimed territories. Furthermore, Amnesty International has noted that in several massacres of Sinhalese, the victims had not been home guards or armed settlers.

Child soldiers

The LTTE has been accused of recruiting and using child soldiers to fight against Sri Lankan government forces. The LTTE was accused of having up to 5,794 child soldiers in its ranks since 2001. Amid international pressure, the LTTE announced in July 2003 that it would stop conscripting child soldiers, but UNICEF and Human Rights Watch have accused it of reneging on its promises, and of conscripting Tamil children orphaned by the tsunami. On 18 June 2007, the LTTE released 135 children under 18 years of age. UNICEF, along with the United States, states that there has been a significant drop in LTTE recruitment of children, but claimed in 2007 that 506 child recruits remain under the LTTE. A report released by the LTTE's Child Protection Authority (CPA) in 2008 stated that less than 40 soldiers under age 18 remained in its forces. In 2009 a Special Representative of the Secretary-General of the United Nations said the Tamil Tigers "continue to recruit children to fight on the frontlines", and "use force to keep many civilians, including children, in harm's way". During the violent parts of the war, though some children were forcefully recruited, many voluntarily joined the LTTE after witnessing or experiencing abuses by Sri Lankan security forces, seeking to "protect their families or to avenge real or perceived abuses." However, the Sri Lankan government's National Child Protection Authority alleged that since the ceasefire children were more likely to be forcibly recruited. Many children have been used in human rights violations such as the torture of political prisoners and massacres in Muslim and Sinhalese villages.

The LTTE argues that instances of child recruitment occurred mostly in the east, under the purview of former LTTE regional commander Colonel Karuna. After leaving the LTTE and forming the TMVP, it is alleged that Karuna continued to forcibly kidnap and induct child soldiers. Soon after Karuna's defection, the LTTE began an intensive campaign to re-recruit Karuna's former cadres, including child soldiers. Many of the former child soldiers were re-recruited by the LTTE, often by force.

Ethnic cleansing

The LTTE is responsible for forcibly removing, or ethnic cleansing, of Sinhalese and Muslim inhabitants from areas under its control.

In October 1987, the LTTE took advantage of communal violence in the Eastern Province. LTTE gunmen led Tamil rioters and ordered Sinhalese to leave, threatening their lives. By 4 October, 5,000 Sinhalese were made homeless. Following the suicide of the Palaly prisoners, LTTE massacres of Sinhalese civilians throughout the Eastern Province occurred. By the end of the week, about 200 Sinhalese were dead and 20,000 had fled the Eastern Province.

The eviction of Muslim residents happened in the north in 1990, and the east in 1992. The expulsion of Muslims had more to do with disagreements over ethnic identity and politics than with religion as the Sri Lankan Muslims did not support the LTTE or the creation of an independent Tamil state and they do not identify with the ethnic Tamils despite being a Tamil-speaking people. The LTTE also saw Muslims as a threat to 'national security' as they alleged their Muslim cadres had defected from their movement to join the Sri Lankan military and paramilitary forces who were allegedly responsible for attacks on Tamil civilians. Yogi, the LTTE's political spokesman claimed that this expulsion was carried out in retaliation for atrocities committed against Tamils in the Eastern Province by Muslims, who were seen by the LTTE as collaborators with the Sri Lankan Army.

Initially young Muslims joined the Tamil militant groups in the early years of Tamil militancy. Muslim ironmongers in Mannar fashioned weapons for the LTTE. LTTE later undertook its anti-Muslim campaigns as it began to view Muslims as outsiders, rather than a part of the Tamil nation. Local Tamil leaders were disturbed by the LTTE's call for the eviction of Muslims in 1990. In 2005, the International Federation of Tamils claimed that the Sri Lankan military purposefully stoked tensions between Tamils and Muslims, in an attempt to undermine Tamil security. As Tamils turned to the LTTE for support, the Muslims were left with the Sri Lankan state as their sole defender, and so to the LTTE, the Muslims had legitimised the role of the state, and were thus viewed as Sri Lankans.

In 2003, the LTTE formally recognised the rights of the Muslim and Sinhalese communities to be present in the north-east in their ISGA proposals.

Mistreatment of prisoners

Executions

LTTE had executed prisoners of war on a number of occasions, in spite of the declaration in 1988, that it would abide by the Geneva Conventions. One such incident was the mass murder of 600 unarmed Sri Lankan Police officers in 1990, in Eastern Province, after they surrendered to the LTTE on the request of President Ranasinghe Premadasa. In 1993, LTTE killed 200 Sri Lanka Army soldiers, captured in the naval base at Pooneryn, during the Battle of Pooneryn. Few months earlier they had executed an officer and several soldiers captured during the Battle of Janakapura. In 1996, LTTE executed 207 military officers and soldiers who had surrendered to the LTTE during Battle of Mullaitivu (1996).

The LTTE has also executed civilian Tamils accused of dissent. Various dissident sources allege that the number of Tamil dissenters and prisoners from rival armed groups clandestinely killed by the LTTE in detention or otherwise ranges from 8,000 to 20,000.

Torture
The LTTE has also tortured its prisoners. One Tamil prisoner held by the LTTE from 1992 to 1995 showed "clear signs of clear signs of burning with heated metal
on his genitals, thigh, buttocks and back". Other methods of torture included hanging the victim upside down and beating them, forcible inhalation of chili fumes, inserting pins underneath fingernails, slashing with razors, and electroshocking. The LTTE tortured suspects based on the victim's refusal to co-operate and for giving information to the Sri Lankan army or IPKF. Torture was also practiced on child soldiers who attempted to flee military service. One girl was left out in the sun for two days after being caught during an attempted escape. Sri Lankan soldiers and police officers were also tortured by the LTTE after being taken prisoner. One lance corporal captured during the Battle of Janakapura was stripped naked and then beaten repeatedly all over his body for half an hour by child soldiers. LTTE prison conditions were often poor, leading to physical and mental health issues among the detainees. Many died due to infections from their wounds. Prisoners were given little food, and sometimes, rotten food was intentionally given. The LTTE used torture during interrogations, where prisoners were interrogated after sleep deprivation and tortured if there were any discrepancies in their story.

Two escapees describe how prisoners were tortured by LTTE:

First escapee:

Second escapee:

War crimes

There are allegations that war crimes were committed by the Sri Lankan military and the rebel Liberation Tigers of Tamil Eelam during the Sri Lankan Civil War, particularly during the final months of the conflict in 2009. The alleged war crimes include attacks on civilians and civilian buildings by both sides; executions of combatants and prisoners by both sides; forced disappearances by the Sri Lankan military and paramilitary groups backed by them; acute shortages of food, medicine, and clean water for civilians trapped in the war zone; and recruitment of child soldiers by both the Tamil Tigers, and the TMVP, a Sri Lankan Army paramilitary group.

A panel of experts appointed by UN Secretary-General (UNSG) Ban Ki-moon to advise him on the issue of accountability with regard to any alleged violations of international human rights and humanitarian law during the final stages of the civil war found "credible allegations" which, if proven, indicated that war crimes and crimes against humanity were committed by the Sri Lankan military and the Tamil Tigers. The panel has called on the UNSG to conduct an independent international inquiry into the alleged violations of international law.

See also

 Sri Lankan Tamil nationalism
 Black July
 Eelam War
 2009 Tamil diaspora protests
 List of assassinations of the Sri Lankan Civil War
 List of attacks attributed to the LTTE
 List of attacks on civilians attributed to Sri Lankan government forces
 Militant use of children in Sri Lanka
 Sri Lankan Tamil militant groups
 Transnational Government of Tamil Eelam

Notes

References

Further reading

Bibliography

Reviews

External links

LTTE web sites
 
 Tamilnet Pro Rebel Website
 Tamil Eelam News Tamil Eelam news site

Sri Lanka Government
 Humanitarian Operation – Factual Analysis, July 2006 – May 2009 A report on strength and impact of LTTE from Sri Lanka Ministry of Defense
 Humanitarian Operation timeline, 1981–2009 The history of Sri Lankan armed forces operations and area controlled by LTTE
 Sri Lanka Ministry of Defence LTTE in Brief An overview of LTTE by Sri Lanka Ministry of Defense

International organisations
 An analysis of Liberation Tigers of Tamil Eelam organization and operations by Federation of American Scientists
 Sri Lankan Tamil Diaspora After LTTE  Relationship between LTTE and the Tamil diaspora, and consequences of LTTE defeat, by International Crisis Group
 Background information on the Tamil Tigers by Council on Foreign Relations
 Overview of Liberation Tigers of Tamil Eelam by Anti-Defamation League
 Funding the "Final War" A Human Rights Watch report on LTTE's fund raising strategies
 Trapped and Mistreated Human rights violations of LTTE, a Human Rights Watch report

International press
 Sri Lankan Civilians Trapped by Tamil Tigers 'Last Stand' Article appeared on The Christian Science Monitor, 3 May 2009
 Guerrilla Tactics – How the Tamil Tigers Were Beaten in an 'Unwinnable' War Article appeared on The Times, 19 May 2009
 Rise and Fall of the LTTE – An Overview A Sri Lanka Guardian article on characteristics of LTTE

 
Organizations established in 1976
Resistance movements
Left-wing militant groups
Separatism in Sri Lanka
1976 establishments in Sri Lanka
Organisations designated as terrorist by India
Organisations designated as terrorist by the European Union
Organisations designated as terrorist by the United Kingdom
Organizations based in Asia designated as terrorist
2009 disestablishments in Sri Lanka
Organizations disestablished in 2009
Sri Lankan Civil War
Defunct organizations designated as terrorist in Asia
Organizations designated as terrorist by Canada
Organizations designated as terrorist by the United States
Organisations designated as terrorist by Sri Lanka
Indian Peace Keeping Force
Assassination of Rajiv Gandhi